Shilpa Manjunath is an Indian actress who has predominantly worked in the South Indian Film Industry. She made her acting debut in Kaali (2018) opposite Vijay Antony, and had her breakthrough in the Tamil film Ispade Rajavum Idhaya Raniyum (2019) opposite Harish Kalyan.

Career
Shilpa Manjunath made her acting debut in Kannada film industry with Mungaru Male 2, Malayalam film industry with Rosapoo and Tamil film debut with Vijay Antony’s Kaali.

Filmography

References

External links

Living people
Indian film actresses
21st-century Indian actresses
Actresses in Tamil cinema
Actresses in Malayalam cinema
Actresses in Kannada cinema
1992 births
Actresses from Bangalore